The 2000 season of the astronomy TV show Jack Horkheimer: Star Gazer starring Jack Horkheimer started on January 3, 2000. The episode numbering scheme for the show changed yet again in this season. This time the "SG" was dropped from the episode number. This had been used in the previous three seasons to differentiate the Star Gazer shows from the Star Hustler shows. The official Star Gazer website hosts the complete scripts for each of the shows.


2000 season

References

External links 
  Star Gazer official website
 

Jack Horkheimer: Star Gazer
2000 American television seasons